Albéniz is a 1947 black-and-white Argentine Silver Condor award-winning biographical drama film directed by Luis César Amadori and written by . The film is based on the life of Spanish composer and pianist, Isaac Albéniz.

The film stars Pedro López Lagar and Sabina Olmos. It won the Silver Condor Award for Best Film and numerous other awards, given by the Argentine Film Critics Association in 1948 for the best picture of the previous year.

Cast

Release and acclaim
The film won the Argentine Film Critics Association Award, the Silver Condor, for best film in 1948. It was also one of the main entries at the 2nd Locarno Film Festival in Switzerland.

The Argentine Academy of Cinematography Arts and Sciences gave several awards for this film:

Best Picture: Argentina Sono Film
Best Director: Luis César Amadori
Best Actor: Pedro López Lagar
Special mentions: Pedro Miguel Obligado (guionista), Sabina Olmos (actriz), Raúl Soldi (escenógrafo), Guillermo Cases (director musical), Antonio Merayo (director de fotografía), Mario Fezia (operador de cámara), José María Paleo (sonidista), Jorge Garate (montajista) and Roque Giacovino (director de fotografía)

References

External links

Albéniz at cinenacional.com 

Argentine biographical drama films
1947 films
1940s Spanish-language films
Argentine black-and-white films
1940s biographical drama films
Films about classical music and musicians
Films about composers
Films directed by Luis César Amadori
Films set in the 19th century
Films set in the 1900s
1947 drama films
1940s Argentine films